Lo'eau Kaiulani LaBonta (born March 18, 1993) is an American professional soccer player who currently plays as a midfielder for Kansas City Current in the National Women's Soccer League (NWSL).

College soccer
LaBonta attended Stanford University from 2011 to 2014, and was part of the NCAA National Championship winning team in 2011.

Club career

Sky Blue FC, 2015
Sky Blue FC drafted LaBonta from Stanford with the 37th overall pick in the 2015 NWSL College Draft. She made six appearances before Sky Blue FC waived her and Meg Morris in July 2015 to make room on the roster for players returning from the 2015 FIFA Women's World Cup.

FC Kansas City, 2016–2017
FC Kansas City signed LaBonta in May 2016. She debuted for FCKC against the Orlando Pride shortly thereafter, and soon earned a regular starting position with the team. FCKC head coach Vlatko Andonovski cited her tenacity in winning possession from opponents for her increased playing time.

Western Sydney Wanderers, 2017–2019 (loan)
In October 2017, LaBonta joined Australian club Western Sydney Wanderers.  She played every match for the Red & Black, scoring one goal.  She returned to the Wanderers for the 2018–19 season and appeared in 9 games.

Utah Royals FC, 2018–2020
After FC Kansas City ceased operations after the 2017 season, LaBonta was officially added to the roster of the Utah Royals FC on February 8, 2018. LaBonta appeared in 16 games for the Royals in the 2018 NWSL season.

She returned to Utah for the 2019 season and scored her first goal for the club on April 21, in a 1–0 win over the Washington Spirit. LaBonta was named to the NWSL Team of the Month for August, she had 1 goal and 2 assists during the month of August.

Kansas City Current, 2021–present
LaBonta followed the transfer of player related assets to the Kansas City expansion team, Kansas City Current, after the Utah Royals FC folded.  She earned the nickname "Celly Queen" for her elaborate celebrations after scoring goals.

Personal life 
LaBonta was born in Rancho Cucamonga, California. LaBonta is married to Sporting Kansas City player Roger Espinoza.

While attending Stanford, she earned a degree in engineering.

Honours 
Individual
 NWSL Best XI: 2022

References

External links 
 
 National Women's Soccer League player profile
 Utah Royals FC player profile 

1993 births
Living people
American expatriate sportspeople in Australia
American people of Native Hawaiian descent
American women's soccer players
Expatriate women's soccer players in Australia
FC Kansas City players
National Women's Soccer League players
People from Rancho Cucamonga, California
NJ/NY Gotham FC draft picks
NJ/NY Gotham FC players
Soccer players from California
Sportspeople from San Bernardino County, California
Stanford Cardinal women's soccer players
Utah Royals FC players
A-League Women players
Western Sydney Wanderers FC (A-League Women) players
Women's association football midfielders
Kansas City Current players